Stars & Stripes is the ninth studio album by American country music artist Aaron Tippin, released on September 10, 2002. It features the singles "Where the Stars and Stripes and the Eagle Fly", "Love Like There's No Tomorrow" (a duet with his wife, Thea) and "I'll Take Love over Money". "Where the Stars and Stripes and the Eagle Fly" was Tippin's biggest crossover hit, peaking at #2 on the country charts and #20 on the Billboard Hot 100. "If Her Lovin' Don't Kill Me" was later recorded by John Anderson on his 2007 album Easy Money, from which it was also released as a single.

Track listing

Personnel
 Bruce Bouton - pedal steel guitar, Weissenborn
 Mark Capps - cymbals, tom-tom
 J.T. Corenflos - baritone guitar, electric guitar
 Melodie Crittenden - background vocals
 Paul Franklin - lap steel guitar, pedal steel guitar
 Kenny Greenberg - electric guitar
 Aubrey Haynie - fiddle, mandolin
 Wes Hightower - background vocals
 John Barlow Jarvis - piano
 Brent Mason - electric guitar, piano
 Steve Nathan - keyboards, Hammond organ, piano, Wurlitzer
 John Wesley Ryles - background vocals
 Neil Thrasher - background vocals
 Aaron Tippin - lead vocals
 Thea Tippin - duet vocals on "Love Like There's No Tomorrow"
 Biff Watson - bouzouki, cowbell, 12-string acoustic guitar, acoustic guitar, electric guitar, synthesizer guitar, Jews Harp, keyboards, drum loops, shaker, tambourine
 Dennis Wilson - background vocals
 Lonnie Wilson - drums, drum loops, tambourine
 Glenn Worf - bass guitar

Chart performance

References

2002 albums
Lyric Street Records albums
Aaron Tippin albums